"Echoes of Harlem", also known as "Cootie's Concerto", is a 1936 composition by Duke Ellington. A piece with a jazz blues sound in F minor with an ostinato piano pattern, it has been cited as one of Ellington's "mood" pieces. It opens with trumpet, playing blues sounds in F minor over the ostinato pattern, followed by a segment of 14 bars with some harmony. The third part, played in velvet sound, by the saxophone section, is in Ab majeur, but starts with Db, the subdominant of Ab. The piece contains thus 3 segments. The original recording features Cootie Williams on trumpet, playing in what Lawrence McClellan describes as "muted" and "in a somber minor key". It has been performed by Roy Eldridge, with Oscar Peterson and Herb Ellis.

Jazz musician and musicologist André Hodeir wrote the following:

References

Songs about New York City
Compositions by Duke Ellington
1930s jazz standards
Jazz compositions in F minor
1936 songs